Jack Doolan may refer to:
 Jack Doolan (American football) (1919–2002), American football running back
 Jack Doolan (actor), English actor
 Jack Doolan (politician) (1927–1995), Australian politician

See also 
 John Doolan (disambiguation)